Goyenda Ginni was an Indian Bengali crime drama anthology television series that premiered on 7 September 2015 to 25 December 2016 and aired on Zee Bangla. It was produced by Shree Venkatesh Films, it starred Indrani Haldar, Saheb Chatterjee, Aditi Chatterjee and Indrajeet Bose. It marks the comeback of Haldar into Bengali television. It replaced the show Raage Anuraage. It got back in March 2020 due to COVID-19 situation.

Plot summary 
The main protagonist, Paroma Mitra leads a dual life of a housewife and a detective. The show features short stories of detective cases which Paroma solves.

Parama Mitra first discovers her talent after her families treasured "mukut" (tiara) was lost. After safely returning the tiara to her grandmother and confronting the thief, Arup Roy a successful police officer who is the brother of her sister-in-law realises Paramas talent and asks her to solve a real life case. Parama accepts while also feeling guilty as her mother-in-law was not a fan of this as what she calls "men's jobs".

Cast

Main

 Indrani Haldar as Parama Mitra / Rumi / Pori / Goyenda Ginni, Parimal's wife.
 Saheb Chatterjee as Dr. Parimal Mitra/Bablu/Dactar Babu, Parama's husband.
 Indrajeet Bose as Inspector Arup Roy (Special Branch)/Rupu, Nandini's younger brother, a brother-like figure to Parama, Mimi's husband.

Recurring
Basanti Chatterjee as Kamala Mitra (Thamma)
Aditi Chatterjee as Nandini Mitra (Nanda), Arup's elder sister, Ashish's wife.
 Ambarish Bhattacharya as Ashish Mitra (Hablu), Nandini's husband.
 Ratna Ghoshal as Ditipriya Mitra aka Priya (Parimal, Ashish, Deval, Neepa, Disha and Mimi's mother)
 Dr. Basudeb Mukherjee / Tapan Ganguly as Samir Mitra (Parimal, Ashish, Deval, Neepa, Disha and Mimi's father)
 Saheli Ghosh Roy as Samadrita Mitra aka Dulki (Daughter of Parama & Parimal)
 Samriddho as Botam (Son of Ashish & Nandini)
 Sampurna Mondal as Velki (Daughter of Ashish & Nandini)
 Adrija Mukherjee as Tinni (Daughter of Neepa & Arnab)
 Chaitali Dasgupta as Ratna Roy (Nandini and Arup's Mother)
 Manasi Sinha as Urmila, Parama's Mother 
 Sourav Chatterjee as
 Deval Mitra aka Tablu, Mahua's husband
 Sandip Sarkar (after surgery)/ Fake Deval
 Mimi Dutta as Mahua Mitra(Gullu), Deval's wife. 
 Sananda Basak as Neepa, Arnab's wife
 Rajiv Bose as Arnab, Neepa's husband
 Sanchari Mondal as Disha, Neelabho's wife.
 Anindya Chatterjee as Neelabho, Disha's husband.
 Priya Malakar as Mimi Roy, Arup's wife.
 Priya Mondal as Rupsi/Roops, Mahua's cousin sister, Arup's temporary love interest.
 Joyjit Banerjee as Diganta Sanyal aka Dicks, Rupsi's namesake boyfriend.
 Subrata Guha Roy as Police Commissioner N.C. Chowdhury, Arup's boss.

Episodic appearances

Since the show ran in a format where Paroma solves detective cases, each case formed a story that was presented over a number of episodes. The important characters in each short story finds mention in the below list. 
 Rita Dutta Chakraborty as Bijoya Sen
 Sayak Chakraborty as Swarthak
 Basabdatta Chatterjee as Tridha Banerjee
 Moumita Gupta as Neelima Banerjee
 Debaparna Chakraborty as Adrija Dutta/Ritoja Dutta
 Pritha Bandopadhyay as Mrs Dutta(Adrija and Ritoja's mother) 
 Lily Chakravarty as Sudeshna Basak
 Dolly Basu as Darshana Roy
 Kuyasha Biswas as Reporter
 Honey Bafna as Samrat
 Ananya Biswas as Mondira
 Deerghoi Paul as Monideepa
 Mafin Chakrabarty as Devika
 Palash Ganguly as Indra
 Rajesh Kr Chattopadhyay as Pratik
 Dwaipayan Das as Neeladri Chatterjee
 Aparajita Ghosh as Odishi dancer Poulami Bhowmick (Pratik's wife)
 Kanyakumari Mukherjee as Ishani Chatterjee
 Satyapriyo Sarkar as Rajatendu Lahiri
 Arindol Bagchi as Swarnendu Lahiri
 Aritra Dutta as Bitonu Lahiri
 Payel Chakrabarty as Bitonu's Wife
 Bikash Bhowmick as Prabesh Ranjan Sanyal
 Mrinal Mukherjee as Sudhakar Sen
 Sanjib Sarkar as Prabhakar Sen
 Sagnik Chatterjee as Kobe Sanyal/Yuvraj Sanyal
 Prantik Banerjee as Bobby Sanyal
 Mallika Banerjee as Reena Sanyal
 Anindita Raychaudhury as Madhuri Sanyal
 Bibriti Chatterjee as Deepa
 Sohan Bandopadhyay as Gurudev
 Barun Chakraborty as Inspector A. Halder
 Pradip Dhar as Sujoy Chatterjee/Sujoy Prasad Ghosh 
 Abhishek Bose as Raj Ghosh
 Alivia Sarkar as Pola
 Rupsa Chatterjee as Kuhu
 Sreyashee Samanta as Shalmoli
 Ishani Sengupta as Soudamini alias Saddy
 Namita Chakrabarty as Raj's Mother
 Indrakshi Nag as Moushumi, Raj's Sister-in-law
 Anuradha Roy as Ballori Gupta
 Pinky Mallick as Rikhia's Mother
 Sakshi Dona Saha as Rikhia Gupta
 Suman Banerjee as Bitan Gupta
 Avery Singha Roy as Ahana
 Riyanka Dasgupta as Borna Gupta, Ballari Gupta's Youngest Daughter
 Kushal Chakraborty as Mridul Laha
 Elfina Mukherjee as Laha family member
 Saugata Bandyopadhyay as Shubhendu Dasgupta
 Nayana Bandyopadhyay as Lipi(Subhendu's Wife) 
 Sandip Chakraborty as Sandip Sarkar (before surgery)
 Sourav Chakraborty as Niloy Som
 Debranjan Nag as Naran
 Sneha Chatterjee as Raye Sen
 Judhajit Banerjee as Robin Sen
 Mishka Halim as Sudha Dutta
 Fahim Mirza as Dibakar Chatterjee
 Kaushik Chakraborty as Pronob Majumdar
 Rumki Chatterjee as Labanya Sikder
 Sargami Rumpa as Sudeshna 
 Debraj Mukherjee as Inspector Sunil Dey
 Sonali Chowdhury as Supriya Sanyal
 Sudip Sarkar as Shubro Dastidar(Madhuri's elder brother)
 Aarja Banerjee as Trishita Sen
 Ritoja Majumder as Apala Mukherjee
 Sudeshna Roy as Rita Chandra
 Sohini Sanyal as Sangeeta Chowdhury
 Maitreyee Mitra as Alokrekha Majumdar
 Reshmi Sen as Gopa
 Arindam Banerjee as Gopa's husband
 Avrajit Chakraborty as Ruchir Sengupta
 Soumya Mukherjee as Koushik Das
 Biresh Chakraborty as Hemanta
 Sumanta Mukherjee as Hemanta's father
 Gita Mukherjee as Hemanta's Paternal Aunt
 Jayanta Banerjee as Prabodh Sarkhel
 Juhi Sengupta as Ritu
 Riya Ganguly Chakraborty as Gunja
 Shrabani Bonik as Sukanya Sen
 Upanita Banerjee as Sunanda Dasgupta

Adaptations

References

External links
Goyenda Ginni on ZEE5

Indian crime television series
2015 Indian television series debuts
Indian anthology television series
Zee Bangla original programming
Bengali-language television programming in India
2016 Indian television series endings